The Pet Sounds Sessions is a 4-CD box set by the American rock band the Beach Boys. Released on November 4, 1997, by Capitol Records, it compiles tracks from the group's 11th studio album Pet Sounds (1966) and its 1965–66 recording sessions. The entire album is included in its original mono mix, as well as a specially-created digital stereo mix. The set also contains instrumental tracks, vocals-only tracks, alternate mixes, and edited highlights from the recording sessions for many of the album's songs, along with several tracks not included on the album.

The box set was nominated for Best Historical Album at the Grammy Awards of 1999. In 2011, it was followed by The Smile Sessions, a similar compilation devoted to the recording of the Beach Boys' unfinished Smile project.

Background

Original producer Brian Wilson writes in the liner notes to The Pet Sounds Sessions: 

Compiler David Leaf explains the purpose of the new compilation: "The first three CDs of this box set are designed to give you a sense of how Brian and the studio musicians cut the tracks [from Pet Sounds] and also to give you a unique glimpse into the harmonic magic of the Beach Boys singing." He adds: "It is not hyperbole to say that for every pop and rock group that followed in the Beach Boys wake, Pet Sounds became an audio benchmark. ... Since that time, nothing has really changed." Leaf had only a minor role in the set with all creative work including editing , mixing and mastering being done by lead producer Mark Linett

Stereo mix
Pet Sounds was first released in 1966 in monaural and duophonic formats. Overseen by Brian Wilson and produced and engineered by Mark Linett, the set includes the first stereo mix of Pet Sounds. These new mixes were made possible by the survival of the original Pet Sounds multitrack tapes. Advances in recording technology allowed the compilers to digitally sync multi-track stems that had been ping-ponged numerous times prior to their final mono mixdown.

The new mixes created for the box set were made in January–February 1996. Linett wrote: "In mixing Pet Sounds in stereo, every attempt was made to duplicate the feel and sound of the original mono mixes. Vocal and instrumental parts that Brian left off the record in 1966 were noted and duplicated, as were the fades." To this end, a Scully model 280 4-track was used to transfer the analog reels to digital multi-tracks – the same model used for Pet Sounds. The mix was then processed through an original tube console from United Western Recorders in the 1960s.

Some exceptions remain, and so the stereo mix of Pet Sounds does contain some differences from the original mono mix. Among them, alternate vocal parts used for the bridge of "Wouldn't It Be Nice" and the end of "God Only Knows" due to the original tracks no longer existing. "You Still Believe in Me" features a single tracked vocal instead of the doubled vocal of the original due to a missing tape. In the mono version, chatter can be heard buried in various tracks; instances of them were omitted from the stereo version at Brian's request.

Release
There was a minor controversy regarding a significant 18-month delay in the release of the box set (originally planned for May 1996 to coincide with the 30th anniversary of the album's original issue). Reportedly, Mike Love was dissatisfied with the accompanying essays that allegedly understated his involvement in the album's making. The original liner notes had featured none of his comments, even though other band members were interviewed, and new notes were subsequently commissioned to Dennis Diken. Biographer Timothy White said that "The Beach Boys apparently didn't get the track selections until late in the production phase, and they all had misgivings about how Capitol envisioned it."

Reception

AllMusic calls the compilation "a fascinating, educational listen, even if it's not necessarily indispensable." Q gave the "enlightening" box set a perfect score and wrote that "the backing music tracks sans vocals opens your ears to a bevy of awe-inspiring nuances previously obscured by singing. At the same time, the isolated vocal tracks are nothing less than spiritual in their emotive wallop." The New York Observers D. Strauss called the stereo mix "pointless", adding, "I must admit that, as a music geek, listening to Mr. Wilson hold myriad consultations on when to beep the bicycle horn in 'You Still Believe in Me' carries a portentous thrill".

The compilation was pivotal to the inception of the Brian Wilson biopic Love & Mercy, as director Bill Pohlad enthuses: "It's just so beautiful and impactful for me to listen to that. So the idea of trying to capture that on film was certainly a big part of my interest in making the movie."

Track listing

Disc four: Pet Sounds Re-Mastered Mono Mix (same as tracks 1–13 of disc one)

References

1997 compilation albums
The Beach Boys compilation albums
Capitol Records compilation albums
Compilation albums published posthumously
Albums produced by Brian Wilson
Albums recorded at United Western Recorders
Albums recorded at Gold Star Studios
Albums recorded at Sunset Sound Recorders
Reissue albums